Anton Sergeyevich Rudakov (born 7 April 1989) is a former Russian football defender.

Club career
He made his debut in the Russian Second Division for FC Dynamo Stavropol on 17 April 2011 in a game against FC Astrakhan.

He made his Russian Football National League debut for FC Torpedo Moscow on 16 July 2012 in a game against FC Ufa.

References

External links
 

1989 births
People from Yoshkar-Ola
Living people
Russian footballers
Russia youth international footballers
Russia under-21 international footballers
Association football defenders
FC Dynamo Moscow reserves players
FC Dynamo Stavropol players
FC Oryol players
FC Torpedo Moscow players
FC Sakhalin Yuzhno-Sakhalinsk players
FC Khimki players
FC Avangard Kursk players
Sportspeople from Mari El
FC Torpedo Vladimir players